Mandaveli (also known as Mandavelli or Mandavelipakkam) is a neighborhood in Chennai, India. It is also termed usually as Mandavelipakkam which in the Tamil language "Mandhai" is 'herd of cattle' and "Veli" is 'grassland'.

Location
Mandaveli is located close to the locality of Mylapore. It is bordered by Mylapore in the north, Santhome (and MRC Nagar) in the east and RA Puram in the south and in the west. It derives its name from a literal translation with reference to the rearing of cows "mandhai" meaning - "herd" and " Veli" which means open space in Tamil. On the west side it is surrounded by Alwarpet. Mandaveli is predominantly a residential area with the main "landmarks" being the 150-year-old Kapali talkies, the Airtel regional office of Tamil Nadu, the Ponds regional head office, Hindustan Lever, and others like Greenways road & boat club. Due to its proximity to the temple dense Mylapore, Mandaveli is home to a large number of Brahmins. Mandavelipakkam is seen as a residential and business area located between Santhome (which is home to the San Thome Basilica) to the north and Adyar to its south. St. John's high school is a prominent educational institutions in this area. Mandaveli MRTS station is built on the MRTS railway line which connects it to Chennai central beach station at the north end and Velachery to the south. Several old buildings are being demolished to make way for newer structures like the Kabali Theatre, which is located near Mandaveli bus stand has been changed into a big apartment. And some other residential buildings also have been changed for business structures.

To the east is Karpagam Avenue — a mostly residential area which is home to the India Cements Towers. Opposite Karpagam Avenue is Mayor Ramanathan Chettiar Nagar (MRC Nagar). This is a newly developing huge area beside the beach. Big corporations and five star hotels have set up office here. The Sun TV Network (located in the Murasoli Maran Towers), TVH Bellicia Tower, The India Cements Building and iconic Mayor Ramanathan Chettiar Marriage Hall and Conference Centre are a few important buildings located here. The JW Marriott Hotel and Leela Palace Hotel are some of the notable landmarks.

References

Neighbourhoods in Chennai